Dexter is an American drama series that aired on Showtime from 2006 to 2013 and is based on the fictional character of the same name created by Jeff Lindsay. It has been nominated for a variety of awards, including eleven Primetime Emmy Awards (four wins), seven Golden Globe Awards (two wins), seven Screen Actors Guild Awards (one win), twelve Satellite Awards (seven wins), thirteen Saturn Awards (five wins), two PGA Awards, two TCA Awards (one win), five WGA Awards, a Peabody Award, and it was selected twice by the American Film Institute as one of the top ten best television programs of the year.

Michael C. Hall, who portrays the title character, is the most-nominated cast member, with twenty-seven nominations; Jennifer Carpenter, who portrays Dexter's adoptive sister, Debra, is second, with seven nominations. Besides the show's cast members, the writers and producers of the show have also been nominated for various awards; writer, producer and showrunner Clyde Phillips has gained six nominations for his work on the show. By 2012, Dexter was nominated for over 100 awards and won 35.

Emmy Awards
The Emmy Awards have been awarded annually since 1949 by the Academy of Television Arts & Sciences to honor excellence in television; they are considered to be the television equivalent to the Academy Awards. Dexter has been nominated for Primetime Emmy Awards, which are awarded to honor excellence in acting and writing in primetime television, as well as Creative Arts Emmys, which are presented in recognition of technical and other related areas in American television programming. In 2007, Dexter received three Emmy Award nominations, all of which were Creative Arts Emmys. The show won two, one for editing and another for the show's opening titles. The following year, the show received five nominations, including nominations for Outstanding Drama Series and Outstanding Lead Actor in a Drama Series (Michael C. Hall). However, the show failed to win any awards that year, losing the award for Outstanding Drama Series to Mad Men and the award for Outstanding Lead Actor – Drama Series to Bryan Cranston for Breaking Bad.

Primetime Emmy Awards

Creative Arts Emmy Awards

Golden Globe Awards
Dexter has been nominated for ten Golden Globe Awards, which are awarded annually by the Hollywood Foreign Press Association to honor the best in film and television. Michael C. Hall has received five acting nominations. The show was nominated for Best Television Series – Drama in 2009 and 2010. Both Michael C. Hall and newcomer to the show, John Lithgow received  Golden Globe Awards for their roles in Dexter in 2010.

Satellite Awards
The Satellite Awards, formerly known as the Golden Satellite Awards, are presented annually by the International Press Academy to the best in cinema and television. Dexter has won seven, including Best TV Series – Drama in 2007 and 2008. In 2007, the show received four nominations, in the categories of Best Actor – TV Drama Series (Hall), Best TV Series – Drama, Outstanding DVD Release of a Television Show (season one), Best Supporting Actor in a TV Series (David Zayas). The show won all of its nominations, making Dexter the most victorious show of that year's ceremony.

Saturn Awards

The Saturn Awards are presented by the Academy of Science Fiction, Fantasy & Horror Films, and honor the best in science fiction and fantasy films and television shows. Dexter has been nominated for eighteen awards and has won five, including the award for Best Syndicated/Cable Television Series in 2007.

Screen Actors Guild Awards
The Screen Actors Guild Awards (SAG awards) are presented annually by the Screen Actors Guild to honor acting in film and television. Dexter has been nominated for seven; Michael C. Hall has received nominations for Outstanding Performance by a Male Actor in a Drama Series in 2007, 2008, 2009 and winning the award in 2010. The fifth and six nominations for the show was for Outstanding Performance by an Ensemble in a Drama Series, in 2009 and 2010, but the eventual recipient of the award was the cast of Mad Men winning the award both years. The show was also nominated in 2010 in the category for Outstanding Stunt Performance in a Series.

: Preston Bailey, Julie Benz, Jennifer Carpenter, Valerie Cruz, Kristin Dattilo, Michael C. Hall, Desmond Harrington, C.S. Lee, Jason Manuel Olazabal, David Ramsey, James Remar, Christina Robinson, Jimmy Smits, Lauren Vélez, David Zayas.

TCA Awards
Through its run Dexter has been nominated for a total of three TCA Awards, which are presented annually by the Television Critics Association. The show has won one award, for Michael C. Hall in the "Individual Achievement in Drama" category.

Writers Guild of America Awards
The Writers Guild of America Awards are presented annually to film and television writers by the Writers Guild of America. Dexter has been nominated for five awards, including "Dramatic Series" three times, but has not won any. Timothy Schlattmann and Scott Reynolds have both gained individual nominations.

{| class="wikitable"
|-
! Year
! Category
! Nominee(s)
! Episode
! Result
|-
|rowspan="2"|2008
| Dramatic Series
| 
| style="text-align:center;"|—
| 
|-
| Episodic Drama
| Timothy Schlattmann
| "The Dark Defender"
| 
|-
| rowspan=2|2009
| Dramatic Series
| 
| style="text-align:center;"|—
| 
|-
| Episodic Drama
| Scott Reynolds
| "There's Something About Harry"
| 
|-
||2010
| Dramatic Series
| 
| style="text-align:center;"|—
| 
|}

: Scott Buck, Daniel Cerone, Drew Z. Greenberg, Lauren Gussis, Kevin Maynard, Clyde Phillips, Scott Reynolds, Melissa Rosenberg, Timothy Schlattmann.
: Scott Buck, Daniel Cerone, Charles H. Eglee, Adam Fierro, Lauren Gussis, Clyde Phillips, Scott Reynolds, Melissa Rosenberg, Timothy Schlattmann.
: Scott Buck, Charles H. Eglee, Lauren Gussis, Clyde Phillips, Scott Reynolds, Melissa Rosenberg, Timothy Schlattmann, Wendy West

Other awardsDexter'' has been nominated for awards at various Guild and society ceremonies, winning six. When the American Film Institute (AFI) selected the show as one of the top ten television programs of 2007, the AFI Award jury stated, "The world through Dexter's dark, droll and wickedly funny gaze, in many ways, defines today's era of television – stories that are wildly ambitious, intricately told, and deeply, emotionally engaging."

References

External sources
 
 

Awards
Dexter